The Sun, as the source of energy and light for life on Earth, has been a central object in culture and religion since prehistory. Ritual solar worship has given rise to solar deities in theistic traditions throughout the world, and solar symbolism is ubiquitous. Apart from its immediate connection to light and warmth, the Sun is also important in timekeeping as the main indicator of the day and the year.

Early history

The earliest understanding of the Sun was that of a disk in the sky, whose presence above the horizon creates day and whose absence causes night. In the Bronze Age, this understanding was modified by assuming that the Sun is transported across the sky in a boat or a chariot, and transported back to the place of sunrise during the night after passing through the underworld.

Many ancient monuments were constructed with the passing of the solar year in mind; for example, stone megaliths accurately mark the summer or winter solstice (some of the most prominent megaliths are in Nabta Playa, Egypt; Mnajdra, Malta and at Stonehenge, England); Newgrange, a prehistoric human-built mount in Ireland, was designed to detect the winter solstice; the pyramid of El Castillo at Chichén Itzá in Mexico is designed to cast shadows in the shape of serpents climbing the pyramid at the vernal and autumnal equinoxes.

See also

Solar worship
Moon in culture
Solar calendar
Sun in fiction

References